Jan van der Bij (born 25 September 1991) is a Dutch rower. He competed in the 2020 Summer Olympics, held July–August 2021 in Tokyo.

References

1991 births
Living people
Dutch male rowers
Olympic rowers of the Netherlands
Rowers at the 2020 Summer Olympics
Rowers from Amsterdam
21st-century Dutch people